Morrisville is a town in the Canadian province of Newfoundland and Labrador. The town had a population of 93 in the Canada 2021 Census. Morrisville is located in the Bay d'Espoir region and is 169 km from Grand Falls-Windsor.

In October 2016, the town, along with a few others in Atlantic Canada was devastated from flooding related to Hurricane Matthew.

Demographics 

See also
 Bay d'Espoir
 Bay d'Espoir Hydroelectric Power Station
 Connaigre Peninsula
 List of cities and towns in Newfoundland and Labrador

References

Towns in Newfoundland and Labrador